Pemba Airport  is a small international airport in Pemba, Mozambique.

Airlines and destinations

Statistics

Airports in Mozambique
Buildings and structures in Cabo Delgado Province